The Commissioners of Woods, Forests and Land Revenues were established in the United Kingdom in 1810 by merging the former offices of Surveyor General of Woods, Forests, Parks, and Chases and Surveyor General of the Land Revenues of the Crown into a three-man commission.  The name of the commission was changed in 1832 to the Commissioners of Woods, Forests, Land Revenues, Works and Buildings.

The hereditary land revenues of the Crown in Scotland, formerly under the management of the Barons of the Exchequer, were transferred to the Commissioners of Woods, Forests, Land Revenues, Works and Buildings and their successors under the Crown Lands (Scotland) Acts of 1832, 1833 and 1835.

The Crown Lands Act 1851 replaced the Commissioners with two separate commissions, the Commissioners of Works and Public Buildings and the Commissioners of Woods, Forests and Land Revenues dividing between them the public and the commercial functions of the Crown lands.

Commissioners of Woods and Forests, 1810-1851
First Commissioners are followed by the names of their co-commissioners

References

Annual Report of Commissioners of Woods & Forests 1811
The Crown Estate publication scheme: website consulted January 2007

Lists of British people
Land management in the United Kingdom
Defunct ministerial offices in the United Kingdom
Forest law
Defunct forestry agencies
1810 establishments in the United Kingdom
1851 disestablishments in the United Kingdom